John Herzfeld (born April 15, 1947) is an American film and television director, screenwriter, actor and producer. His feature film directing credits include Two of a Kind (1983), 2 Days in the Valley (1996), 15 Minutes (2001) and The Death and Life of Bobby Z (2007). He has also directed numerous made-for-television movies, including The Ryan White Story (1989), The Preppie Murder (1989), Casualties of Love: The "Long Island Lolita" Story (1993), and Don King: Only in America (1997) for which he was nominated for an Emmy and won the DGA award for Outstanding Directorial Achievement in Dramatic Specials. He won a Daytime Emmy Award for directing the 1980 ABC Afterschool Special titled "Stoned".

Early life
Herzfeld was born on April 15, 1947, in Newark, New Jersey and grew up in West Orange, New Jersey. His father, who ran a small maintenance company, had a great love of movies, theater and ballet, and exposed his children to the arts as often as he could.

Career

ABC Afterschool Specials
Herzfeld began his directing career with two ABC Afterschool Specials. He won a Daytime Emmy for best directing in children's programming for his work on the 1980 film Stoned, the story of a shy, bullied high school student (played by Scott Baio) who becomes involved with marijuana. He also won the first annual "Scott Newman Drug Abuse Prevention Award" for his writing on Stoned. In addition to writing and directing, Herzfeld also played the part of a concerned teacher in Stoned. His second Afterschool Special, Run, Don't Walk, also starred Scott Baio about two teenager learning to cope with their life in wheelchairs.

Two of a Kind
In 1983, Herzfeld made his debut as a feature film director in the romantic comedy, Two of a Kind, starring Olivia Newton-John and John Travolta. Travolta plays a failed inventor who robs a bank, and Newton-John is a teller who puts deposit slips in Travolta's bag and keeps the cash for herself. In heaven, a group of angels (including two portrayed by Charles Durning and Scatman Crothers) try to persuade God (voice by Gene Hackman) not to send a new plague to the Earth if these two characters can be reformed. The film was a critical and commercial flop and was nominated for five Golden Raspberry Awards including both Worst Director and Worst Screenplay for Herzfeld, although its soundtrack album was praised and certified Platinum.

Television movies
In the late 1980s and 1990s, Herzfeld directed and wrote several made-for-TV movies, including:
 Daddy (1987): Herzfeld wrote and directed this drama about teen pregnancy starring Dermot Mulrooney, Tess Harper, Patricia Arquette and Danny Aiello.
 A Father's Revenge (1988): Herzfeld directed this thriller about German terrorists kidnapping an airplane crew starring Brian Dennehy and Ron Silver.
 The Ryan White Story (1989): Herzfeld wrote and directed this biographical drama about 13-year-old hemophiliac and AIDS victim Ryan White starring Lukas Haas, Judith Light and Sarah Jessica Parker.
 The Preppie Murder (1989): Herzfeld wrote and directed this crime drama based on the Central Park murder of Jennifer Levin by Robert Chambers, a heavily publicized murder that became known as the "Preppie Murder" case. William Baldwin starred as Chambers with Lara Flynn Boyle portraying Levin.
 Casualties of Love: The "Long Island Lolita" Story (1993): Herzfeld wrote and directed this dramatization of the Amy Fisher-Joey Buttafuoco story starring Alyssa Milano as Fisher and Jack Scalia as Buttafuoco.
 Remember (1993): Herzfeld wrote and directed this adaptation of the Barbara Taylor Bradford novel starring Donna Mills, Stephen Collins and Ian Richardson.

2 Days in the Valley
In 1996, Herzfeld returned to feature films as the director and screenwriter of the crime thriller 2 Days in the Valley with an all-star cast that included Danny Aiello, Jeff Daniels, Teri Hatcher, Charlize Theron, Keith Carradine, Eric Stoltz, Marsha Mason, James Spader, Paul Mazursky and Louise Fletcher. The film was Charlize Theron's feature film debut.

Herzfeld described the movie, which follows 10 characters over 48 hours in the San Fernando Valley, as follows: "The movie is about a lot of people who either never achieved their goals, or screwed up their lives, or dropped the football the first time it was thrown to them. What a lot of characters share in common is this unrealized potential."

When the press kit and advance newspaper stories for 2 Days in the Valley depicted Herzfeld as "a first-time feature filmmaker" moving from the small screen to the big screen, the Los Angeles Times published a story focusing on the omission of Herzfeld's earlier work on Two of a Kind.

Don King: Only in America
In 1997, Herzfeld directed Don King: Only in America, a biographical dramatization of the life of boxing promoter Don King aired by HBO. The film starred Ving Rhames as King and Jeremy Piven in a supporting role as closed-circuit promoter Hank Schwartz. The film received much critical success winning the Emmy Award for Outstanding Made for Television Movie, as well as the Directors Guild of America's DGA Award for Outstanding Directorial Achievement in Dramatic Specials. At the time, Herzfeld described his goal for the film:"I'm trying to tell the tale of a full-rounded character--comes from a dark past, lives in a dark world where there's always clouds overhead and somehow when the ground separates underneath him, he always seems to jump over it and never fall in. ... And how he does that and who props him up and what and when, that's what the movie's all about."

15 Minutes
Herzfeld also wrote and directed the 2001 feature 15 Minutes pairing Robert De Niro and Edward Burns. Herzfeld wrote at the time that he intended the film as a study of the country's fascination with celebrity—thus the title's reference to Andy Warhol's famous quote about "15 minutes of fame." The film received a mixed review from the Los Angeles Times which noted:"Like many ambitious, provocative films, '15 Minutes' is a bit of a mess. Both audacious and unwieldy, exciting and excessive, this dark thriller is too long, too violent and not always convincing. But at the same time, there's no denying that it's onto something, that its savage indictment of the nexus involving media, crime and a voracious public is a cinematic statement difficult to ignore."

Later works
From 2004 to 2006, Herzfeld returned to television, writing and directing multiple episodes of the Rob Lowe series, Dr. Vegas.

In 2007, Herzfeld directed the crime thriller The Death and Life of Bobby Z starring Paul Walker and Laurence Fishburne. Walker plays a prisoner offered a deal by the DEA in which he can win his freedom by impersonating a legendary drug dealer as part of a prisoner exchange.

In 2008, he wrote and directed the made-for-television feature SIS, about the Special Investigation Squad, an elite secret police force that hunts down criminals on the streets of Los Angeles.

In 2009, Herzfeld directed the 90-minute documentary "Inferno: The Making Of The Expendables" for his friend Sylvester Stallone. The two first worked together in 1969 on a low-budget self-produced film called Horses, later again on Cobra, where Herzfeld plays a goon that Stallone's character sets on fire during the film's climax. Herzfeld also directed Stallone in his 2014 film Reach Me.

Filmography

Film

Television

References

External links
 

1947 births
Living people
Film directors from New Jersey
Action film directors
American film directors
American male screenwriters
American television directors
Daytime Emmy Award winners